Dong Peng is a protected multiple use management area in the Koh Kong Province of Cambodia. It is located on the north end of the Bay of Kompong Som.

References

Geography of Koh Kong province
Protected areas of Cambodia